Arbués is a locality located in the municipality of Bailo, Spain, in Huesca province, Aragon, Spain. As of 2020, it has a population of 11.

Geography 
Arbués is located 68km northwest of Huesca.

References

Populated places in the Province of Huesca